At least two ships of the French Navy have been named Laplace:

 , a  launched in 1919 and scrapped in 1935
 , a  launched in 1988

French Navy ship names